Donji Rakani (Cyrillic: Доњи Ракани) is a village in the municipality of Novi Grad, Republika Srpska, Bosnia and Herzegovina.

References

Populated places in Novi Grad, Bosnia and Herzegovina